Lisheen Castle is an 18th-century building in Thurles, County Tipperary, Ireland. It was originally a three storey Irish Palladian country house with castle features being added in the early 19th- century. It was burnt down by the IRA in 1921 during the Irish War of Independence and disused for eighty years before being bought in 1994 and restored.

See also 
Judkin-Fitzgerald Baronets
Richard John Uniacke

References

External links
 Lisheen Castle

Country houses in Ireland
Castles in County Tipperary